The Audiovox Snapper is a 2005 cell phone made by Audiovox that was available from Virgin Mobile.  It includes a color screen, a VGA camera, and Bluetooth technology.

References
 audiovox snapper cdm8915 virgin mobile specs
 user manual
 specs per phonescoop

Mobile phones by company